Lemke may refer to:

Lemke (surname)
Lemke (Marklohe), a small village in Germany
14327 Lemke, an asteroid

See also
Lemke's algorithm, by Carlton Lemke